General elections were held in Cambodia on 26 July 1998. The result was a victory for the Cambodian People's Party (CPP), which won 64 of the 122 seats, resulting in its leader Hun Sen becoming Prime Minister. Opposition parties sought a recount and claimed there had been irregularities, claims supported by many international observers. Voter turnout was 93.7%.

Background
Following the disputed 1993 general elections, Norodom Ranariddh of FUNCINPEC and Hun Sen of the CPP had become co-Prime Ministers. In July 1997, Sen forced Ranariddh out of government after a dispute on to handle rebellious members of FUNCINPEC and former Khmer Rouge leaders. Ranariddh was subsequently replaced by Ung Huot. The removal of Ranariddh led to at least 89 extra-judicial killings.

General elections were announced for May 1998, but were later postponed until July by the National Assembly as preparations including voter registration were running late.

On 30 March 1997 an opposition rally outside the National Assembly was hit by a grenade attack, with at least 16 killed and 100 injured.

Electoral system
The 122 members of the National Assembly were elected by closed list proportional representation from 21 multi-member constituencies based on the provinces.

There were 1,380 individual polling stations. At the end of polling, ballot boxes were taken to Commune Election Commissions set up by the National Election Committee (NEC) and were counted the next day. Statements regarding the count were added up at the Provincial Election Commissions, and the national tally made at the NEC. Parties could make complaints at any of the four levels during the count.

The results were countersigned and the statement of the count were announced outside the counting centers.

Conduct
The observation of the election was coordinated by the United Nations with its Joint International Observer Group (JIOG), which consisted of European Union and ASEAN representatives. More than 500 foreign monitors worked alongside a national observer group to keep track of the voting process.

Many observers and other international organizations reported that the electoral process was heavily influenced by the CPP and that there had been intimidation, violence, coercion, lack of accountability and transparency. Following the elections, opposition party politicians and activists were reported to be relocating towards provincial cities and Phnom Penh and many were concerned about concealing their location due to fear of persecution.

A lack of training, many complicated forms, and packing procedures caused difficulties with the election count, especially in areas with low levels of education, literacy, and electoral experience. The NEC noted that there was a lack of space and planning, to the point where it was difficult to retrieve controls and recounts. Ballot materials were stacked on top of each other, which made it hard for the NEC to deal with the large number of complaints and demands for recounts. In total there were 800 complaints filed, 304 passing preliminary investigation related to voter intimidation, recount demands, and other concerned programs.

Results

Aftermath
On 30 June, there was controversy surrounding the seat allocation formula. The English-language press of Phnom Penh and opposition parties claimed that the formula had been tampered with after the election results have been collected in order to favor the CPP. Annex V of the Law on the Election of National Assembly described the seat allocation method and all parties were informed and agreed to it in June. However, there appeared to be a difference between the original Khmer version and the English version. The misunderstanding led to large protests from the opposition.

See also
List of members of the National Assembly of Cambodia, 1998–2003

References

1998 in Cambodia
Elections in Cambodia
Cambodia